Eric Rotenberg from the North Carolina State University, Raleigh, NC was named Fellow of the Institute of Electrical and Electronics Engineers (IEEE) in 2015 for contributions to the microarchitecture of high-performance and reliable microprocessors.

References

Fellow Members of the IEEE
Living people
Year of birth missing (living people)
Place of birth missing (living people)
North Carolina State University faculty
American electrical engineers